Franklin was a rural New Zealand parliamentary electorate. It existed from 1861 to 1996 during four periods.

Population centres
The original electorate from 1861 to 1881 included the South Auckland towns of Papatoetoe, Papakura, Pukekohe and Waiuku, and west of Waiuku to the West Coast. When reconstituted in 1890 the northern boundary was north of Papakura, and (with the growth of Auckland) now excluded Papatoetoe.

In December 1887, the House of Representatives voted to reduce its membership from general electorates from 91 to 70. The 1890 electoral redistribution used the same 1886 census data used for the 1887 electoral redistribution. In addition, three-member electorates were introduced in the four main centres. This resulted in a major restructuring of electorates, and Franklin was one of eight electorates to be re-created for the 1890 election.

The 1981 census had shown that the North Island had experienced further population growth, and three additional general seats were created through the 1983 electoral redistribution, bringing the total number of electorates to 95. The South Island had, for the first time, experienced a population loss, but its number of general electorates was fixed at 25 since the 1967 electoral redistribution. More of the South Island population was moving to Christchurch, and two electorates were abolished, while two electorates were recreated. In the North Island, six electorates were newly created, three electorates were recreated (including Franklin), and six electorates were abolished.

The 1987 electoral redistribution took the continued population growth in the North Island into account, and two additional general electorates were created, bringing the total number of electorates to 97. In the South Island, the shift of population to Christchurch had continued. Overall, three electorates were newly created, three electorates were recreated, and four electorates were abolished (including Franklin). All of those electorates were in the North Island. Changes in the South Island were restricted to boundary changes.

History
The electorate existed from 1861 to 1881 as a two-member electorate, when it was split into the Franklin North and Franklin South electorates. One of the first MPs, Marmaduke Nixon was killed in action in 1864 whilst leading an assault on a Māori village during the Invasion of the Waikato, forcing the 1864 by-election. In 1890 it was reconstituted, to 1978 and then from 1984 to 1987, and 1993–96. From 1978 to 1984 it was renamed the Rangiriri electorate, and from 1987 to 1993 it was renamed the  electorate but in 1993 it reverted to "Franklin". In 1996 with MMP, the area became part of the Port Waikato electorate.

The single-member electorate was first represented by Ebenezer Hamlin from 1890 to 1893 when he retired. From 1896 to 1925 Franklin was represented by the Reform Party's Massey, known as Farmer Bill, the Prime Minister from 1912 to 1925. Ewen McLennan then held the electorate for one term before he retired, and was replaced by Massey's son Jack Massey.

In 1935 Franklin was won by Arthur Sexton of the Country Party, but he lost the seat in 1938 to Jack Massey, now standing for the National Party. He held the seat until 1957, when he was deselected by the National Party in favour of Alfred E. Allen. Alf Allen held the seat until 1972, when he retired and was replaced by future National minister Bill Birch, who held the seat over the remaining three periods that the seat existed.

Members of Parliament

Multi-member electorate
Key

Single-member electorate

Election results

1993 election

1984 election

1975 election

1972 election

1969 election

1966 election

1963 election

1960 election

1957 election

1954 election

1951 election

1949 election

1946 election

1943 election

1938 election

1935 election

1931 election

 
 
 
 
 

 

Table footnotes:

1928 election

1925 by-election

1922 election

1919 election

1914 election

1911 election

1908 election

1905 election

1902 election

1899 election

1896 election

1893 election

1890 election

1874 by-election

1868 by-election

Notes

References

External links 
 1870 description of boundaries
 1902 map
 1911 map (page 29) and description of boundaries
 1917 map (page 27) and description of boundaries
 1937 map
 1946 map

Historical electorates of New Zealand
1860 establishments in New Zealand
1996 disestablishments in New Zealand
1881 disestablishments in New Zealand
1978 disestablishments in New Zealand
1987 disestablishments in New Zealand
1890 establishments in New Zealand
1984 establishments in New Zealand
1993 establishments in New Zealand
New Zealand electorates in the Auckland Region